Lynford is a rural locality in the Lockyer Valley Region, Queensland, Australia.

Geography 
Lockyer Creek forms the southern and eastern boundary of the locality. The land is flat and used for crop farming. Forest Hill Ferndale Road passes through the locality roughly parallel and to the north of the creek; the housing is mostly along this road.

History 
The locality was named and bounded on 3 June 1994.

References 

Lockyer Valley Region
Localities in Queensland